Plakophilin-4 is a protein that in humans is encoded by the PKP4 gene.

Function 

Armadillo-like proteins are characterized by a series of armadillo repeats, first defined in the Drosophila 'armadillo' gene product, that are typically 42 to 45 amino acids in length. These proteins can be divided into subfamilies based on their number of repeats, their overall sequence similarity, and the dispersion of the repeats throughout their sequences. Members of the p120(ctn)/plakophilin subfamily of Armadillo-like proteins, including CTNND1, CTNND2, PKP1, PKP2, PKP4, and ARVCF. PKP4 may be a component of desmosomal plaque and other adhesion plaques and is thought to be involved in regulating junctional plaque organization and cadherin function. Multiple transcript variants have been found for this gene, but the full-length nature of only two of them have been described so far. These two variants encode distinct isoforms.

Interactions 

PKP4 has been shown to interact with:
 Erbin, 
 PDZD2, and
 PSEN1.

References

Further reading 

 
 
 
 
 
 
 
 
 
 
 
 
 
 
 
 

Armadillo-repeat-containing proteins